Debus emarginatus, is a species of weevil widely distributed throughout the Old World tropics.

Distribution
It is native to China, India, Sri Lanka, Indonesia, Japan, Laos, Malaysia, Myanmar, Philippines, South Korea, Thailand, Vietnam, Australia, Papua New Guinea and Solomon Islands.

Description
The average length of the species is about 3.3 to 3.6 mm. The postero-lateral extensions of elytra are short, and less than the width of apical emargination. The declivity is shallowly excavated. Elytral declivity clearly, confusedly punctate.

Host plants
A polyphagous pest, it is found from many host plants.

 Abies fabri
 Azfelia palembanica
 Castanea argentea
 Castanopsis
 Cinchona
 Cyrtophyllum giganteum
 Dipterocarpus baudii
 Durio zibethinus
 Falcataria moluccana
 Ficus
 Koompassia excelsa
 Mangifera foetida
 Neobalanocarpus heimii
 Palaquium
 Pinus tabulaeformis
 Pinus yunnanensis
 Populus
 Quercus
 Sarcocephalus cordatus
 Shorea leprosula
 Symplocos
 Terminalia

Control
It is a high-risk quarantine pest where they show inbreeding, with the males generally mating with their sisters within the parental gallery system before dispersal. Adult beetle does not actually feed on the plant material but uses it as a medium for growing the fungus which is the larval food. They are mostly found in felled timber. Attacked plants show signs of wilting, branch die-back, shoot breakage, chronic debilitation, sun-scorch or a general decline in vigour.

References 

Curculionidae
Insects of Sri Lanka
Beetles described in 1878